Williamson Herald is an online news outlet based in Franklin, Tennessee. The newspaper provides coverage to Williamson County, Tennessee, including the cities of Franklin, Brentwood, Spring Hill, Nolensville, and Fairview, and also publishes print versions. It was founded in 2005 and is owned by CMD Publishing.

References

Internet properties established in 2005
Mass media in Williamson County, Tennessee
Franklin, Tennessee
Publications established in 2005
2005 establishments in Tennessee